Khoroshyovo may refer to:
Khoroshyovo (Moscow Central Circle), a station on the Moscow Central Circle, Russia
Khoroshyovo-Mnyovniki District, a district of North-Western Administrative Okrug, Moscow, Russia

Khorosheve, a settlement in Kharkiv Oblast, Ukraine